Polyporus melanopus is a species of mushroom in the genus Polyporus. It can be found growing on dead wood, or from a submerged sclerotium, from spring through fall.

Description

Polyporus melanopus has a brown velvety cap which grows up to 10 cm across. It is centrally depressed, and has tough flesh. The stipe has a soft black felt covering. The species is inedible.

Similar species include Polyporus badius, P. elegans, and P. varius. All three also have a black felt on the stipe, but only on the lower half for the latter two. P. badius has no Clamp connections. Also similar are P. tuberaster and Jahnoporus hirtus, the latter of which has a gray-brown cap.

References

Further reading
E. Garnweidner. Mushrooms and Toadstools of Britain and Europe. Collins. 1994.

External links

melanopus
Fungi described in 1821
Inedible fungi